The Petty Girl (1950), known in the UK as Girl of the Year, is a musical romantic comedy Technicolor film starring Robert Cummings and Joan Caulfield. Cummings portrays painter George Petty who falls for Victoria Braymore (Caulfield), the youngest professor at Braymore College who eventually becomes "The Petty Girl".

Plot
In New York City, George Petty (Robert Cummings) tries to convince car manufacturer B. J. Manton to use pretty women to help advertise his dreary new car model. He is not succeeding when Manton's daughter, the often-married Mrs. Connie Manton Dezlow (Audrey Long), interrupts the business meeting, takes a liking to the handsome young artist, and makes herself his patron. Soon, she has furnished him with a lavish apartment, complete with a butler named Beardsley (Melville Cooper). She also talks him into abandoning his cheesecake paintings in favor of more respectable portraits.

Meanwhile, Victoria Braymore (Joan Caulfield), the youngest professor at Braymore College, attends a conference in New York to defend the school against charges that it is outdated and old-fashioned. She has led a sheltered life, raised by the older professors after the death of her parents (the founders of the college), and is only allowed to go with a chaperone, her friend Dr. Crutcher (Elsa Lanchester).

George meets Victoria in an art museum. She resists his attempts to become better acquainted, but finally agrees to dinner, provided he finds a date for Dr. Crutcher. Desperate, he gets Beardsley to pretend to be his uncle Ben. The dinner is a disaster; Beardsley gets drunk, Dr. Crutcher thinks she is George's date, and Victoria is distant. Finally, George decides to leave, when Victoria surprises him by accompanying him to a nightclub frequented by artists. When a drink is spilled on her dress, she goes to the powder room, where the attendant offers to iron it. However, the police raid the establishment; in the rush of escaping people, Victoria ends up getting arrested dressed only in her slip. Her picture is published on the front page of the newspaper. An almost identical scene occurred in the movie Together Again (1944).

When she gets out of jail, she cuts short her trip and returns to Braymore. George follows her and gets a job as a busboy at the faculty residence. Using the newspaper photograph, he blackmails her into going out with him. Their first two "dates" end badly. Then, when he has her sneak out to pose for a painting in his room, she is seen by nosy Professor Whitman (Mary Wickes), who misinterprets the situation. Though the other professors are inclined to leniency, Victoria cheerfully quits, finally agreeing with George's view that she is being stifled there.

Victoria goes to George's apartment, where she meets her rival for his affections, Mrs. Dezlow. She tries to persuade George that Mrs. Dezlow is doing the same thing to him that the professors did to her, namely molding him to satisfy her wishes and expectations, but he does not agree. Victoria then sneaks into the art museum and replaces one of the paintings with the one George painted of her in a bathing suit. The resulting publicity lands her a starring role in the burlesque. Embarrassed, George gets an injunction preventing her from performing as the "Petty Girl".

Since the injunction only applies to public places, Victoria crashes the stuffy private party being given by Mrs. Dezlow to promote George. There, she, a male quartet, and twelve beautiful women (including an uncredited Tippi Hedren in her film debut), each representing a month, perform a musical number, much to the appreciation of B. J. Manton. The businessman changes his mind about George's initial proposal. George realizes Victoria is right, and they kiss and make up.

Cast
 Robert Cummings as George Petty
 Joan Caulfield as Professor Victoria Braymore
 Elsa Lanchester as Dr. Crutcher
 Melville Cooper as Beardsley
 Audrey Long as Mrs. Connie Manton Dezlow
 Mary Wickes as Professor Whitman
 Frank Orth as Moody, process server
 John Ridgely as Patrolman
 Dorothy Abbott as December Petty Girl
 Joan Larkin as July Petty Girl
 Tippi Hedren as Ice Box Petty Girl (uncredited)
 Vivian Mason as Lovey

Production

RKO
In October 1942 RKO studios signed an agreement with George Petty to make a film called The Petty Girl. In real life Petty's daughter was the model for The Petty Girl but RKO wanted an unknown to play this role and were going to undertake a nationwide search. Bert Gannet was working on a script. In November Anne Shirley was announced for a lead role. Betty Wells was also signed. In March 1943 Rosemay La Plance was assigned to a lead role. In June Amelita Ward was assigned to the film. In October Virginia Mayo was announced for the film.

Columbia
RKO ended up not making the film and the rights were bought by Columbia. In September 1946 Al Bloomingdale was going to produce the film for Columbia. By January 1947 Ann Miller was going to play the title role and Devery Freeman had written the script.

Production kept being delayed but then Columbia officially reactivated the project in March 1949. Nat Perrin was to produce and Charles Vidor would direct. In July Robert Cummings signed to star, meaning It's a Man's World, for which he was previously announced at Columbia, was postponed. Edward Hope was working on the script.

Joan Caulfield lobbied to star in the film because it was a sexier sort of role than she had played in the past. She joined the film in July.

In early August 1949 Charles Vidor went to Lake Arrowhead to scout locations. Filming was to begin 21 August. On August 5 Vidor was suspended by Columbia under his $3000 a week contract for refusing to make the movie. Henry Levin took over. Vidor denied he refused to direct Petty Girl. Columbia then said Vidor had objected to the story and made no attempt to prepare for the movie. Vidor said he turned up willing to work. The case settled out of court.

George Petty worked on the film as a consultant. Filming started September 6, 1949.

The success of the film led to Cummings having a three-picture contract at Columbia.

Musical numbers
For all songs, the music was composed by Harold Arlen, with lyrics by Johnny Mercer.

 "Fancy Free", performed by Joan Caulfield (dubbed by an uncredited Carol Richards)
 "Calypso Song", performed at the beginning by Movita, segueing to Caulfield in a daydream sequence (both dubbed by Richards)
 "I Loves Ya", performed by Robert Cummings (dubbed by Hal Derwin) and Caulfield (Richards)
 "The Petty Girl", performed by Caulfield (Richards), the Petty Girls, and a male quartet

Release
Janis Carter did a 26 city appearance tour to promote the film.

The New York Times said the film "may not make you ache with laughter but neither will it bore you." The Los Angeles Times said "its comedy is diverting, never painful."

References

External links
 
 
 
 

1950 films
1950 musical comedy films
1950 romantic comedy films
American musical comedy films
American romantic comedy films
American romantic musical films
Columbia Pictures films
Films directed by Henry Levin
1950s English-language films
1950s American films